Nam Shan is a village in Sai Kung District, Hong Kong.

Recognised status
Nam Shan, including Kak Hang Tun and Long Mei, is a recognised village under the New Territories Small House Policy.

History
At the time of the 1911 census, the population of Nam Shan was 86. The number of males was 36.

References

External links
 Delineation of area of existing village Nam Shan (Sai Kung) for election of resident representative (2019 to 2022)

Villages in Sai Kung District, Hong Kong